France Bleu Pays Basque (Basque: Frantzia Urdina Euskal Herria) is a public service radio station serving Iparralde and the Pyrénées-Atlantiques department of France. Via FM, it is also available in southern Landes, part of Beárn and Gipuzkoa provinces. It's also one of the only Basque language radio stations in France.

History 
Radio Côte Basque was born in 1961, under the impetus of two Bayonne journalists, Yves Darriet and Jean Garreto, while the public service was experimenting with its first radio broadcasts in a few regions of France. From the outset, the station broadcast programs in two languages, French and Basque. In 1963, the station broadcast a quarter of an hour of daily local information, the airtime being increased thereafter in 1972, then again in 1975 as recognition for regional languages grew very slowly.

Radio France Pays Basque was created on January 1, 1983. At the end of the same year, the commissioning of the Rhune transmitter enabled it to increase its broadcasting area. Airtime is increased to six hours of daily programs, both in Basque and in French.

On July 1, 1991, Radio France Pays Basque inaugurated a trilingual news service (Basque, French and Spanish) intended for the listeners of Guipuscoa. The motto was: "Radio without borders".

On September 4, 2000, the local radio stations of Radio France were brought together in the France Bleu network, which provided a common national program complemented by regional output. Radio France Pays Basque became France Bleu Pays Basque.

Frequencies 
France Bleu Pays Basque broadcasts in several different frequencies:
103.1 FM - Mauléon-Licharre
102.4 FM - Saint-Jean-Pied-de-Port
90.4 FM - Saint-Palais
90.8 FM - Tardets-Sorholus
101.3 FM - Baiona

References 

French-language radio stations
Radio stations in France
Radio stations established in 1961
1961 establishments in France
Basque-language mass media